Behind the Mask is an autobiographical memoir written by Patrick Treacy, which describes his training as a doctor, his travels and work after qualification, and a period during which he provided medical treatment to Michael Jackson. In Ireland, he became his dermatologist treating conditions like his vitiligo and developed a deeper friendship with the singer. Jackson and Treacy shared a common interest in HIV and Africa, and worked on humanitarian projects together. The Hans India in their review of the memoir stated 'Treacy has also defended Jackson in his book where he writes about Jackson's empathy towards children suffering from HIV in Rwanda and expressed his desire to do a concert from them'.  In April 2022 he released a book called The Evolution of Aesthetic Medicine, an autobiographical memoir covering 2012–2021. In the book, Dr Treacy provides a historical narrative of how botulinum toxin, dermal fillers and laser technologies made their way into the field of aesthetic medicine, detailing the evolution of these procedures.In January 2023 he released another book about his experiences, Aesthetic Complications and Other Interesting Cases. According to publisher Austin Macauley, the book contains many aesthetic complication cases encountered by Dr Treacy since he first established a hyaluronidase protocol for dermal fillers in 2005.

References

External links
 Behind The Mask on RTE Radio 1

Works about Michael Jackson
2015 non-fiction books